Aleksei Fyodorovich Goncharov (16 January 1879, in Moscow – 23 April 1913, in Moscow) was a Russian Empire chess master.

He won twice Moscow City Chess Championship in 1901 (jointly with Raphael Falk) and 1909. He also tied for 2nd–3rd in 1899 (the 1st RUS-ch, minor section), took 4th in 1900/01 (the 2nd All-Russian Masters' Tournament, Mikhail Chigorin won), shared 2nd, behind Boyarkov, in 1902, and took 2nd, behind Mikhail Chigorin, in 1907, all in Moscow.

References

External links

1879 births
1913 deaths
Chess players from the Russian Empire
19th-century chess players